5th Brigade may refer to:

Australia
5th Light Horse Brigade
5th Brigade

Canada
5th Canadian Infantry Brigade
5 Canadian Mechanized Brigade Group

Croatia
5th Guards Brigade (Croatia)

Germany
5th Guards Infantry Brigade

Greece
5th Airmobile Brigade (Greece)

India
5th (Mhow) Cavalry Brigade
5th Indian Infantry Brigade

Japan
5th Brigade (Japan)

Lebanon 
 5th Infantry Brigade (Lebanon)

New Zealand
5th Infantry Brigade

Russia 
5th Anti-Aircraft Rocket Brigade

South Africa
5th Infantry Brigade (South Africa)

Ukraine
5th Mechanized Brigade (Ukraine)

United Kingdom
5th Cavalry Brigade (United Kingdom)
5th Infantry Brigade (United Kingdom)
5th Guards Armoured Brigade
5th Mounted Brigade (United Kingdom)
5th Parachute Brigade (United Kingdom)
 Artillery Brigades
 5th Brigade Royal Field Artillery 
 V Brigade, Royal Horse Artillery

United States
5th Armored Brigade (United States)

Yugoslavia
5th Krajina (Kozara) Assault Brigade

Zimbabwe
5th Brigade (Zimbabwe)